María Emilia Islas Gatti (18 April 1953 – disappeared 27 September 1976) was a Uruguayan political activist and anarchist, who disappeared in Buenos Aires in 1976.

Biography 
She was born on 18 April 1953, at the Harvard Clinical Sanatorium in Montevideo. The only daughter of María Ester Gatti and Ramón Islas, María Emilia was named for her grandmother. She lived her first years in the Cordon neighbourhood.

In 1965, María Emilia entered the Zorillia de San Martin high school where she became engaged in politics and political organizing. In 1970 she became more involved and joined the Federación Anarquista Uruguaya (FAU), the Oriental Revolutionary Popular Organization 33 (OPR 33); Asociación de Estudiantes de Magisterio en la Resistencia Obrero Estudiantil (ROE) and finally in Argentina, with the Party for Victory of the People (PVP).

On 28 November 1973, she married Jorge Zaffaroni, also an activist. By 1974, the political situation in Uruguay became intolerable, so they left for Buenos Aires. María Emilia arrived during the second week of December, then six months pregnant. Zaffaroni joined her on 11 January 1975, and their daughter Mariana was born on 22 March 1975.

Disappearance

The family was arrested on 27 September 1976 at their home in Parque Chacabuco, Buenos Aires. They were then taken to the clandestine detention center "Automotres Orletti." According to testimony given by Orestes Estanisalo Bello, the couple was interrogated by personnel from the Servicio de Inteligencia Uruguayo (SID). They were suspected to be members of OPR-33, a Uruguayan militant group based in Buenos Aires. Their detention and disappearance was part of the Dirty War tactics under "Operation Condor".

María Emilia was most likely moved to a final destination between 5 and 6 October 1976. She and Jorge Zaffaroni remain on a list of missing Uruguayans in Argentina.

Her mother, María Ester Gatti, was an active member of Madres y Familiares de Detenidos Desaparecidos. Due to her persistence, Islas' daughter was located in 1983, and her identity confirmed in 1993.

See also
List of people who disappeared

References

External links 
 María Emilia Islas Gatti (Spanish) 
 Maria Emilia Islas Gatti (French)
Por esos ojos (1997 documentary)
ACÁ ESTAMOS - Capítulo 5 - Mariana Zaffaroni y Juan Pablo Moyano (episode of documentary television series featuring Islas' daughter)

1953 births
1970s missing person cases
Enforced disappearances in Argentina
Missing people
Missing person cases in Argentina
People from Montevideo
Uruguayan activists
Victims of the Dirty War
Year of death uncertain
Uruguayan anarchists
Murdered anarchists